Nobre is a Portuguese surname. Notable people with the surname include:
Alfredo Nobre da Costa (1923–1996), Portuguese engineer and politician
Ana Luiza Nobre (born 1964), Brazilian historian and author
Anna Christina Nobre (born 1963), Brazilian neuroscientist known as Kia Nobre
António Nobre (1867–1900), Portuguese poet
Camila Nobre (born 1988), Brazilian footballer and futsal player
Carlos Nobre (rugby union) (1940–2014), Portuguese rugby union player
Dudu Nobre (born 1974), Brazilian singer and composer
Édson de Jesus Nobre (born 1980), Angolan footballer known simply as Edson
Fernando Nobre (born 1951), Portuguese doctor
Pacheco Nobre (1925–2018), Portuguese footballer
Márcio Nobre (born 1980), Brazilian-Turkish footballer
Marlos Nobre (born 1939), Brazilian composer
Paulo Nobre (born 1968), Brazilian lawyer and rally driver

Portuguese-language surnames